Tuula Linnainmaa ( Forss; born 8 January 1942) is a retired Finnish politician representing the National Coalition Party. She served as a Member of Parliament for the Uusimaa constituency in 1987–1997, and as the transport minister in the first Lipponen cabinet in 1995–1997. In 1997, she was appointed the inaugural Governor of the newly-formed Southern Finland Province, serving there until 2003. She was also active for many years in local politics, as a member of the Espoo City Council.

References

Members of the Parliament of Finland (1987–91)
Members of the Parliament of Finland (1991–95)
Members of the Parliament of Finland (1995–99)
National Coalition Party politicians
People from Hämeenlinna
1942 births
Living people